Vincenzo Ciriello (born 16 August 2002) is an Italian football player. He plays for Cittadella.

Club career
Ciriello was raised in the youth teams of Casertana and made his debut for the senior squad in July 2018 in a Coppa Italia game at the age of 15. He made his Serie C debut on 25 August 2019 against Potenza.

On 10 August 2021, he signed with Serie B club Cittadella. He made his Serie B debut for Cittadella on 23 January 2022 against Vicenza.

References

External links
 
 

2002 births
Living people
Italian footballers
Association football defenders
Casertana F.C. players
A.S. Cittadella players
Serie C players
Serie B players